This is a list of the 20 longest spacewalks, also known as an extra-vehicular activity or EVA. "Agency" here refers to the organization under whose auspices the EVA was conducted (so a Swiss or Japanese astronaut would be listed under NASA if they wore NASA suits and were controlled by Mission Control Houston). 

For details, see lists of spacewalks from 1965-1999, 2000-2014, and 2015-present.

List

See also
 List of spacewalkers
 List of spacewalks and moonwalks 1965–1999
 List of spacewalks 2000–2014
 List of spacewalks since 2015
 List of cumulative spacewalk records

References 

Human spaceflight
Extravehicular activity
Spacewalks
Spaceflight timelines